The 2023 Louisiana State Senate election is scheduled to be held on October 14, 2023, with runoff elections on November 18, 2023. All 39 seats in the Louisiana State Senate are up for election to four-year terms. It will be held concurrently with elections for all statewide offices and the Louisiana House of Representatives.

Under Louisiana's jungle primary system, all candidates will appear on the same ballot, regardless of party, and voters may vote for any candidate, regardless of their party affiliation.

Background 
In the 2019 state legislature elections, Republicans expanded their majorities in both chambers to 68 in the House and 27 in the Senate. Going into the 2023 elections, Republicans held a two-thirds supermajority in the Senate, though not in the House.

The 2023 election will be the first election held under new district maps following redistricting as a result of the 2020 Census.

Overview

See also 
 2023 United States state legislative elections
 2023 Louisiana House of Representatives election

References 

Louisiana State Senate
State Senate